Parabiobessa ugandae is a species of beetle in the family Cerambycidae, and the only species in the genus Parabiobessa. It was described by Breuning in 1936.

References

Crossotini
Beetles described in 1936
Monotypic beetle genera